Majorelle Blue is a clear, intense, fresh shade of blue.

In 1924, the French artist Jacques Majorelle constructed his largest art work, the Majorelle Garden in Marrakech, Morocco, and painted the garden walls, fountains, features and villa this very intense shade of blue, for which he trademarked the name Majorelle Blue. He had noticed the colour in Moroccan tiles, in Berber burnouses, and around the windows of buildings such as kasbahs and native adobe homes.

See also 

List of colours

References 

French inventions
Shades of blue
Architecture in Morocco